Pataveh is a city in Kohgiluyeh and Boyer-Ahmad Province, Iran.

Pataveh may refer to:
 Pataveh, Chaharmahal and Bakhtiari (پاتوه - Pātāveh), Chaharmahal and Bakhtiari Province
 Pataveh, Hormozgan (پاتوه - Pātaveh), Hormozgan Province
 Pataveh, Dehdez (پاتاوه - Pātāveh), Khuzestan Province
 Pataveh, Susan (پاتوه - Pātaveh), Khuzestan Province
 Pataveh, Boyer-Ahmad (پاتاوه - Pātāveh), Kohgiluyeh and Boyer-Ahmad Province
 Pataveh-ye Delita (پاتاوه - Pātāveh), Boyer-Ahmad County, Kohgiluyeh and Boyer-Ahmad Province
 Pataveh-ye Gelal (پاتوه - Pātaveh), Boyer-Ahmad County, Kohgiluyeh and Boyer-Ahmad Province
 Pataveh-ye Kari (پاتاوه - Pātāveh), Chaman County, Kohgiluyeh and Boyer-Ahmad Province
 Pataveh-ye Ajam (پاتاوه - Pātāveh), Kohgiluyeh County, Kohgiluyeh and Boyer-Ahmad Province
 Pataveh-ye Charusa (پاتاوه - Pātāveh), Kohgiluyeh County, Kohgiluyeh and Boyer-Ahmad Province
 Pataveh-ye Pey Rah (پاتاوه - Pātāveh), Kohgiluyeh County, Kohgiluyeh and Boyer-Ahmad Province
 Pataveh-ye Rud Sameh (پاطاوه - Pāţāveh), Kohgiluyeh County, Kohgiluyeh and Boyer-Ahmad Province
 Pataveh, Landeh (پاتاوه - Pātāveh), Kohgiluyeh and Boyer-Ahmad Province
 Pataveh District, in Dana County, Kohgiluyeh and Boyer-Ahmad Province
 Pataveh Rural District, in Dana County, Kohgiluyeh and Boyer-Ahmad Province